Mikael Höglund (born 15 May 1962) is a Swedish bass player, previously of the bands Tryckvåg, Great King Rat and Thunder, appearing on the 1995 album Behind Closed Doors, Live Circuit and  Their Finest Hour...and a bit, Live at the BBC (1990-1995). He also appeared several times with Swedish cover band Pumpbolaget.

Höglund co-wrote the songs Moth to the Flame and Future Train on the Behind Closed Doors album.

Other albums that Mikael Höglund appears on
 Great King Rat - Great King Rat (Planet Records, 1992)
 Great King Rat - Out of the Can (Z Records, 1999)
 Thunder - Behind Closed Doors (EMI, 1995)
 Thunder - Live Circuit (Toshiba EMI, 1995)
 Thunder - Their Finest Hour...and a bit (EMI, 1995)
 Thunder - Live at the BBC (1990-1995) (EMI, 2010)
 Jekyll & Hyde - Fallen Angel
 A Tribute to Grand Funk Railroad
 Alfonzetti - Machine
 The Sweet According to Sweden - A tribute to Sweet (Rivel Records, 2004)
 Audiovision - The Calling (Rivel Records, 2005)
 Beautiful Grey - Fine Forever.
 Elements Of Frictions (Lions Pride Music, 2014)
 Airstream - Kingdom Of Isolation (Metalville, 2015)
 Sea Of Sorrow - Left Behind (Sorrow Records, 2017)

References 

1962 births
Living people
Swedish bass guitarists
Thunder (band) members